Orlando Duque (born September 11, 1974 in Cali, Colombia) is a Colombian high diver. He won the first ever Gold medal in the sport at the 2013 World Aquatics Championships in Barcelona, Spain.

Works 

 High Diver. My Life on the Edge, PANTAURO, 2020.

References

Sportspeople from Cali
Living people
Male high divers
Colombian male divers
1974 births
World Aquatics Championships medalists in high diving
20th-century Colombian people
21st-century Colombian people